Fuad Nimani was a Montenegrin-Albanian politician, born in Shkodër, Albania to an Albanian family from Ulcinj, Montenegro in 1948. He finished the elementary school in Ulcinj, secondary school in Pristina, Kosovo and he graduated at the Faculty of Mathematics at the Universiteti i Prishtinës. He died on 25 April 2012 in Ulcinj.

Public engagement 

He served as vice-president and president of one of the main Albanian party in Montenegro Democratic Union of Albanians. From 2001 to 2006 he served as Mayor of Ulcinj, and after that as Minister of Human and Minority Rights at the Montenegrin government to 2009.

See also
Mayor of Ulcinj
Ulcinj
Democratic Union of Albanians

Notes

1948 births
People from Ulcinj
2012 deaths
Albanians in Montenegro
Montenegrin politicians
Government ministers of Montenegro